The French Future (LAF) is a French political movement founded by dissidents from the Debout la France party, in disagreement with Nicolas Dupont-Aignan on his strategy for the 2021 regional elections, and wishing to get closer to Marine Le Pen and the National Rally. Claiming Gaullism, it is classified on the right or even on the far-right of the political spectrum.

History 
On November 22, 2020, Jean-Philippe Tanguy, vice-president of Debout la France, announced his departure, followed by around sixty executives from Nicolas Dupont-Aignan's movement to form a collective of "sovereigntist Gaullists" (initially called Demain la France) which wishes to support Marine Le Pen in the next presidential election.

The foundation of French Future is formalized on March 22, 2021, in the presence of Marine Le Pen. The movement defines itself as independent and an ally of the National Rally and wishes to stand alongside it in the regional and departmental elections in June. It obtained 14 regional advisers in eight regions.

Regional representation

References 

Right-wing populist parties
Right-wing populism in France
French nationalist parties
Eurosceptic parties in France
Gaullist parties
Political parties of the French Fifth Republic
Political parties established in 2021
Right-wing parties in France